In My Life is a 1998 album compiled and produced by George Martin. It consists almost entirely of cover versions of The Beatles songs which Martin produced originally, together with one original composition.

It features musicians like Celine Dion, Phil Collins and Bobby McFerrin, alongside the actors Robin Williams, Sean Connery, Billy Connolly, Goldie Hawn and Jim Carrey.

Jeff Beck's version of "A Day in the Life" was nominated for the Grammy Award for Best Pop Instrumental Performance in 2000.

Reception

Writing for Allmusic, music critic Cub Koda wrote "The results are in the true George Martin orchestrated tradition, with several interesting twists and turns along the way." Conversely, Sarah Zupko of PopMatters wrote Martin "has chosen to go out with a whimper instead of a bang" and of the album in general; "I don’t really have to tell you that Goldie Hawn impersonating a chanteuse on “A Hard Day’s Night” or Sean Connery literally reading “In My Life” is an embarrassing display, do I?"

Track listing
All songs by John Lennon and Paul McCartney, except where noted.

"Come Together" – 4:37
Featuring Robin Williams and Bobby McFerrin on vocals
"A Hard Day's Night" – 3:24
Featuring Goldie Hawn on keyboards and vocals
"A Day in the Life" – 4:44
An instrumental version, featuring Jeff Beck on guitar
"Here, There and Everywhere" – 3:18
Featuring Céline Dion on vocals
"Because" – 3:18
Featuring Vanessa-Mae on violin
"I Am the Walrus" – 4:31
Featuring Jim Carrey on vocals
"Here Comes the Sun" (George Harrison) – 3:30
Featuring guitarist John Williams
"Being for the Benefit of Mr. Kite!" – 2:58
Featuring Billy Connolly on vocals
"The Pepperland Suite" (George Martin)  – 6:19
A new medley of the music that originally appeared in the 1969 film and album Yellow Submarine
"Golden Slumbers"/"Carry That Weight"/"The End" – 5:38
Featuring Phil Collins on drums, percussion and vocals
"Friends and Lovers" (George Martin) – 2:24
"In My Life"  – 2:29
Featuring Sean Connery on lead spoken word vocal
"Ticket to Ride" – 3:56
Featuring the Meninas Cantoras de Petrópolis on vocals, only included in the South American release
"Blackbird" – 2:59
Featuring Bonnie Pink on keyboards and vocals, only included in the Japanese release

Charts

Weekly charts

Year-end charts

References

George Martin albums
The Beatles tribute albums
Albums produced by George Martin
1998 compilation albums
Albums arranged by George Martin
Albums conducted by George Martin